Leschenaultia bicolor is a species of bristle fly in the family Tachinidae. It is found in North America and South America. It is a parasitoid of Halysidota caterpillars, including Halysidota cinctipes and Halysidota pearsoni.

References

Further reading

 
 

Exoristinae
Articles created by Qbugbot
Insects described in 1846
Diptera of North America
Diptera of South America